Anbe Sivam ( Love is god) is a 2021 Indian-Tamil language television series which premiered on 18 October 2021 and ended on 3 July 2022 on Zee Tamil. It stars Vikram Shri and Kavitha Gowda in the lead roles. This show is based on Zee TV series Punar Vivaah.

Synopsis
Nalla Sivam and Anbu Selvi are Victims of failed marriages. But their lives take a turn when the lonely hearts decide to marry each other for the sake of their children. Will they rediscover love forms the crux of the story.

Cast

Main 
 Vikram Shri as Adv. Nalla Sivam: Iniya and Oviya's father; Anbu's husband; Arasi's ex-husband
 Raksha Holla (2021–2022) → Kavitha Gowda (2022) as Anbu Selvi (Anbu): Kalai and Bharathi's mother; Sivam's wife; Bhaskar's ex-wife

Supporting
 Shreeka in a dual role as Iniya and Oviya: Sivam and Arasi's daughter
 Anshita as Kalai: Anbu and Bhaskar's daughter
 Hadeed Kavin as Bharathi: Anbu and Bhaskar's son
 Sabitha Anand as Lakshmi: Shabapathi's wife, Sivam's mother
 Sivan Srinivasan as Shabapathi: Lakshmi's husband, Sivam's father
 Krithika Laddu as Adv. Punnagai Arasi (Arasi): Sivam's ex-wife, Shekar's second wife, Iniya and Oviya's mother
 Varun Udhai as Bhaskar: Anbu's ex-husband, Kayal and Bharathi's father
 Nishma Chengappa as Dr. Malarvizhi (Malar): Kamakshi's daughter, Anbu's sister-in-law, Saravanan's wife
 Vasudeva Krish Madhusudhan as Saravanan: Sivam's brother, Malar's husband
 Priyaa Vishwa (2021–2022) → Bharani Elangovan (2022) as Geetha: Anbu's best friend
 Nathan Shyam as Adv. Shekar: Arasi's second husband
 Rhema Ashok as Poonguzhali (Kuzhali): Nalla Sivam's ex-fiancée, Anbu's friend, later became enemy
 Deepa Shree as Kamakshi: Bhaskar and Malar's mother, Anbu's mother-in-law
 Parthiban as Rajarathnam: Arasi's father
 Isvar Ragunathan as Sugumar

Production
Actor Vikram Shri was selected to portray the lead role as Nalla Sivam. Actress Pavani Reddy was initially selected in the role of Anbu Selvi, but she quit the show before the series release, because of the opportunity of entering Bigg Boss (Tamil). So the team finalised Raksha Holla to portray the role of Anbu Selvi. In January 2022, Raksha Holla was removed from the series by the production team due to her appearance is not fit for the role. So Kavitha Gowda replaced her in the role of Anbu Selvi from episodes 86. Krithika Laddu was selected to play the role of Punnagai Arasi, Nalla Sivam's ex-wife, who is the main antagonist in the show.

Special and Crossover episodes
 Anbe Sivam held a two and half hours non-step special sunday episode for Anbu-Sivam Marriage titled 'Anbe Sivam MEGA Thirumana Vaibhavam' on 6 March 2022.
 Anbe Sivam with Rajini series held a one hour episodes of Super Sanagamam from 23 May to 6 June 2022.

References

External links

Anbe Sivam at ZEE5

Zee Tamil original programming
Tamil-language romance television series
2021 Tamil-language television series debuts
Tamil-language television shows
Television shows set in Tamil Nadu
2022 Tamil-language television series endings
Tamil-language television series based on Hindi-language television series